Quercus variabilis, the Chinese cork oak, is a species of oak in the section Quercus sect. Cerris, native to a wide area of eastern Asia in southern, central, and eastern China, Taiwan, Japan, and Korea.

Description

Distribution and habitat
The species can be found in evergreen and deciduous forests below , in the Chinese provinces of Anhui, Fujian, Gansu, Guangdong, Guangxi, Guizhou, Hebei, Henan, Hubei, Hunan, Jiangsu, Jiangxi, Liaoning, Shaanxi, Shandong, Shanxi, Sichuan, Taiwan, Yunnan, Zhejiang, as well as in Japan and Korea.

Uses
It is cultivated in China to a small extent for cork production, though its yield is lower than that of the related cork oak. It is also occasionally grown as an ornamental tree. For pharmaceutical grade production of Ganoderma lucidum, known in China as ‘the mushroom of immortality,’ the dead wood logs of Q. variabilis are used.

References

External links
 line drawing, Flora of China Illustrations vol. 4, fig. 359, 2 
 line drawing, Manual of Vascular Plants of the Lower Yangtze Valley China Illustration fig. 57 

variabilis
Trees of China
Trees of Japan
Trees of Korea
Trees of Taiwan
Ornamental trees
Plants described in 1850